Rekovichi is a rural locality (a station) in Dubrovsky District, Bryansk Oblast, Russia. The population was 8 as of 2010. There is 1 street.

Geography 
Rekovichi is located 11 km southeast of Dubrovka (the district's administrative centre) by road. Rekovichi is the nearest rural locality.

References 

Rural localities in Dubrovsky District